The Florida Film Critics Circle Award for Best Ensemble Acting is an award given by the Florida Film Critics Circle (from 1997 till 2003) to honor the finest achievements in film-making.

Winners
1997: Boogie Nights
1999: Magnolia
2000: State and Main
2001: Gosford Park
2002: Thirteen Conversations About One Thing
2003: A Mighty Wind
2014: The Grand Budapest Hotel
2015: Spotlight
2016: American Honey
2017: Three Billboards Outside Ebbing, Missouri
2018: The Favourite
2019: Little Women
2020: Mangrove

Florida Film Critics Circle Awards
Film awards for Best Cast